Vol. 5 Released in 1990 is the fifth studio album from the Argentine Ska, Reggae band Los Fabulosos Cadillacs

This album is fresh for the musical exigencies of the age and the one which gave the band access to the North American market, through a contract signed with the international producer Tommy Cookman.

Track listing 

 "Los Olvidados" ("The forsaken") (Flavio Cianciarulo, Sergio Rotman)  – 3:13
 "Demasiada Presión" ("Too Much Pressure") (Vicentico)  – 4:12
 Te Extraño ("Miss You") (Mick Jagger, Keith Richards)  – 4:39
 "Radio Kriminal" (Vicentico, Cianciarulo)  – 4:38
 "Caballo de Madera" ("Wood Horse") (Cianciarulo)  – 3:16
 "Planeta Cero" ("Zero Planet") (Cianciarulo)  – 3:23
 "La Chica de los Ojos Café" ("Brown-eyed Girl) (Renato)  – 4:21
 "Electrasonic V" (Vicentico)  – 2:16
 "Tanto Como Un Dios" ("As Much as a God") (Vicentico)  – 3:35

Personnel 

 Vicentico – vocals
 Flavio Cianciarulo – bass
 Anibal Rigozzi – guitar
 Mario Siperman – keyboards
 Fernando Ricciardi – drums
 Naco Goldfinger – tenor saxophone
 Sergio Rotman – alto saxophone
 Daniel Lozano – trumpet & flugelhorn

External links 
 Los Fabulosos Cadillacs Official Web Site
Volumen 5 at MusicBrainz
[ Volumen 5] at Allmusic

Los Fabulosos Cadillacs albums
Sony Music Argentina albums
1990 albums